The Roman Catholic Diocese of Rutana is a diocese located in the city of Rutana in the Ecclesiastical province of Gitega in Burundi.

History
 January 17, 2009: Established as Diocese of Rutana from Diocese of Bururi and Diocese of Ruyigi.

Special churches
The Cathedral is the Cathédrale Saint-Joseph in Rutana.

Bishops
 Bishops of Rutana (Roman rite)
 Bonaventure Nahimana (January 17, 2009 – ...)

See also
Roman Catholicism in Burundi

References

External links
 GCatholic.org
 Catholic Hierarchy 

Roman Catholic dioceses in Burundi
Roman Catholic Ecclesiastical Province of Gitega
Christian organizations established in 2009
Roman Catholic dioceses and prelatures established in the 21st century